T18E2 may refer to: 

Development prototype of the M75 armored personnel carrier
T18 Boarhound varianet